Alexander D'Arcy (
10 August 1908 – 20 April 1996) was an Egyptian stage, television and film actor with an international film repertoire.

Career
Born Alexander Sarruf in Cairo, Egypt, D'Arcy, variously credited as Alexandre D'Arcy, Alex D'Arcy, Alexandre Darcy and Alex d'Arcy, appeared in some 45 films, mostly as a suave gentleman or smooth rogue. He went to France, acted in a number of films, then departed for America. He eventually left New York for Hollywood where he started by playing supporting roles in several films in the late 1930s, including , Stolen Holiday, and The Awful Truth (all 1937).

His roles diminished in importance, and by the 1960s, he acted mostly on television and resurfaced in horror films, notably It's Hot in Paradise (1962) and as Dracula in Blood of Dracula's Castle (1969). Evidently a favorite of such cult directors as Roger Corman, Russ Meyer and Sam Fuller, D'Arcy was seen in Corman's  (1967), Meyer's  (1971) and Fuller's Dead Pigeon on Beethoven Street (1972 or 1974 TV movie).

Throughout his life, D’Arcy split his time between his homes in the United States and Europe. In addition to acting, he worked as a restaurateur in Berlin. He was naturalized as a United States citizen in Los Angeles in May 1942. In his petition for naturalization, he declared that upon naturalization he wished his name to be legally changed from Joseph Alexandre Fabre to Alexander d'Arcy.

Personal life
D’Arcy was married twice, first to actress Arleen Whelan and then, in 1964, to actress Yutta Darcy. They had a daughter named Susannah d'Arcy and divorced in 1973.

Death
D’Arcy died on 20 April 1996 at his home in West Hollywood, California at the age of 87.

Filmography

 The Garden of Allah (1927) - Bit Role (uncredited)
 Champagne (1928) - (uncredited)
 Paradise (1928) - Spirdoff
 Daughter of the Regiment (1929)
 A Romance of Seville (1929) - Ramon Dunigo
 La revanche du maudit (1930) - Edmond Saint-Edme
 À Nous la Liberté (1931) - Le gigolo (uncredited)
 King of the Hotel (1932) - Alonzo
  (1932)
 Je vous aimerai toujours (1933) - Jean-Claude
 Poliche (1934) - Saint-Wast
 La Kermesse héroïque (Carnival in Flanders) (1935) - Le capitaine / The Captain
 Stolen Holiday (1937) - Anatole
 The Prisoner of Zenda (1937) - De Gautet (uncredited)
 The Awful Truth (1937) - Armand Duvalle
 She Married an Artist (1937) - Phillip Corval
 Women Are Like That (1938) - Paul - a Headwaiter (uncredited)
 Flight to Fame (1938) - Perez
 Topper Takes a Trip (1938) - Baron
 Good Girls Go to Paris (1939) - Paul Kingston
 Rhumba Rhythm at the Hollywood La Conga (1939, Short) - Himself (cameo)
 5th Ave Girl (1939) - Maitre d'Hotel
 Three Sons (1939) - Prince Nicky - Phoebe's Husband
 Another Thin Man (1939) - Gigolo Who Danced with Nora Charles at West Indies Club (scenes deleted)
 City of Chance (1940) - Baron Joseph
 Irene (1940) - Mr. Dumont (uncredited)
 The Blonde from Singapore (1941) - Prince Sali
 Marriage Is a Private Affair (1944) - Mr. Garby (uncredited)
 The Red Angel (1949) - Ocelli
 Harriet Quimby (1952, TV Movie) - Andre Houpert
 Man on a Tightrope (1953) - Rudolph
 Vicki (1953) - Robin Ray
 How to Marry a Millionaire (1953) - J. Stewart Merrill
 Les clandestines (1954) - Louis d'Osterkoff
 Abdulla the Great, aka Abdullah's Harem (1955) - Marco
 Soldier of Fortune (1955) - Rene Dupont Chevalier
 Horrors of Spider Island (Ein Toter hing im Netz) (1960) - Gary Webster
 The Festival Girls (1961) - Larry Worthington
 Casanova wider Willen (1964, TV Movie) - Jack Perri
 Fanny Hill (1964) - Admiral
 The Incredible Sex Revolution (1965) - Pierre
 Way...Way Out (1966) - Deuce Hawkins
 The St. Valentine's Day Massacre (1967) - Joe Aiello
 Blood of Dracula's Castle (1969) - Count Dracula - alias Count Charles Townsend
 The Seven Minutes (1971) - Christian Leroux
 Tatort (1973, TV Series, episode: Tote Taube in der Beethovenstraße) (1973) - Mr. Novak (final appearance)

References

External links

1908 births
1996 deaths
20th-century Egyptian male actors
Egyptian expatriates in the United States
Expatriate male actors in the United States
Egyptian male film actors
Egyptian male stage actors
Egyptian male television actors
Male actors from Cairo
Egyptian male silent film actors
Male Western (genre) film actors
People from Greater Los Angeles